Constantin Dinu (29 April 1945 – 14 December 2022) was a Romanian rugby union player who played as a prop.

Awards

Club
Winner of the Liga Națională de Rugby (1966, 1967)
Winner of the Cupa României (1982)

International
Winner of the 1968–69 FIRA Nations Cup
Winner of the FIRA Trophy (1975, 1977, 1981, 1983)

References

1945 births
2022 deaths
Romania international rugby union players
Romanian rugby union coaches
Rugby union props
Rugby union players from Bucharest